The Philharmonia Virtuosi is a chamber orchestra that first performed in 1974. It was founded by Richard Kapp, who conducted the orchestra until the time of his death in 2006.

References

American orchestras